This is a list of the 173 municipalities in the province and autonomous community of La Rioja, Spain.

See also

Geography of Spain
List of cities in Spain

External links
Maps of La Rioja municipalities (Sistema de Información Geográfica de la C.A. de La Rioja)

 
Rioja, La